Chathi, also spelt Chatthi, is a village of Haripur District in the Khyber Pakhtunkhwa province of Pakistan. It is part of Beer Union Council and is located at 34°7'0N 72°58'0E with an altitude of 625 metres (2053 feet).

References

Populated places in Haripur District